Asomiya Pratidin is an Assamese daily newspaper, caters whole Assam with five editions published from Guwahati, Bongaigaon, Dibrugarh, and North Lakhimpur, Assam, India. The fifth edition is the web version, available to all. It is the largest circulated Assamese daily. The other periodical and magazines published under Pratidin group are Sadin, Nandini and Satsori.

Awards :

 Shri Jayanta Baruah and Asomiya Pratidin had been awarded by Prime Minister Dr. Manmohan Singh, in 2008 for the outstanding contribution of vernacular daily. Indian Language Newspapers Association (ILNA) hosted this award.
 Inclusion of Asomiya Pratidin in the LIMCA BOOK OF RECORDS – 2008, as one of the most highly circulated newspapers of North Eastern States.

Sister Publications & Organisation:

 Sadin
 Nandini 
 Satsori
 Pratidin Time

References

External links
Official Website

Assamese-language newspapers
1995 establishments in Assam
Newspapers established in 1995
Mass media in Guwahati